Bennex is a supplier of components, systems and services to the global offshore industry, to the Norwegian related maritime sector and to the international subsea market.  Bennex is one of the members of the Norwegian Centres of Expertise (NCE). Bennex was founded in 1993.

Products of Bennex include sealing and termination technology for subsea equipment.  The company also manufactures electrical equipment for undersea machinery.  Bennex also supplies seismic cables.

References

Petroleum production
Manufacturing companies of Norway